Mella is a town and municipality in the Santiago de Cuba Province of Cuba.

In addition to Mella itself, the municipality includes the population centers of Mangos de Baraguá, Palmarito de Cauto, Regina, and other minor villages.

Demographics
In 2004, the municipality of Mella had a population of 33,667.

Twin towns
 Castel San Giorgio, Italy

See also
List of cities in Cuba
Municipalities of Cuba

References

External links

Populated places in Santiago de Cuba Province